The Communauté d'agglomération Coulommiers Pays de Brie is the communauté d'agglomération, an intercommunal structure, centred on the town of Coulommiers. It is located in the Seine-et-Marne department, in the Île-de-France region, north-central France. It was created in January 2018 by the merger of the former Communauté de communes du Pays de Coulommiers and the Communauté de communes du Pays Fertois. In January 2020 it was expanded with 12 communes from the former communauté de communes du Pays Créçois. Its area is 582.7 km2. Its population was 92,149 in 2018, of which 14,757 in Coulommiers.

Composition
The communauté d'agglomération consists of the following 54 communes:

Amillis
Aulnoy
Bassevelle
Beautheil-Saints
Boissy-le-Châtel
Bouleurs
Bussières
La Celle-sur-Morin
Chailly-en-Brie
Chamigny
Changis-sur-Marne
Chauffry
Chevru
Citry
Condé-Sainte-Libiaire
Couilly-Pont-aux-Dames
Coulommes
Coulommiers
Coutevroult
Crécy-la-Chapelle
Dagny
Dammartin-sur-Tigeaux
Faremoutiers
La Ferté-sous-Jouarre
Giremoutiers
Guérard
Hautefeuille
La Haute-Maison
Jouarre
Luzancy
Maisoncelles-en-Brie
Marolles-en-Brie
Mauperthuis
Méry-sur-Marne
Mouroux
Nanteuil-sur-Marne
Pézarches
Pierre-Levée
Pommeuse
Reuil-en-Brie
Saâcy-sur-Marne
Saint-Augustin
Sainte-Aulde
Saint-Jean-les-Deux-Jumeaux
Sammeron
Sancy
Sept-Sorts
Signy-Signets
Touquin
Tigeaux
Ussy-sur-Marne
Vaucourtois
Villiers-sur-Morin
Voulangis

References

Intercommunalities of Seine-et-Marne
Agglomeration communities in France